A legal interest refers to the legally enforceable right to possess or use property. The term may refer to past, present, or future interests. 

Legal interest may also refer to:
Equitable interest, which is a legal interest that may be enforced by equitable remedies
Estate in land, a possessory interest in real property
Government interest, the rationale of a government in enacting a law or regulation
Right to property, the normative concept of entitlement to property
Other forms of nonpossessory interest in land